The 2018 Eastern Kentucky Colonels football team represented Eastern Kentucky University during the 2018 NCAA Division I FCS football season. They were led by third-year head coach Mark Elder and played their home games at Roy Kidd Stadium as a member of the Ohio Valley Conference. They finished the season 7–4, 5–2 in OVC play to finish in third place.

Previous season
The Colonels finished the 2017 season 4–7, 3–5 in OVC play to finish in a tie for fifth place.

Preseason

OVC media poll
On July 20, 2018, the media covering the OVC released their preseason poll with the Colonels predicted to finish in sixth place. On July 23, the OVC released their coaches poll with the Colonels predicted to finish in fifth place.

Preseason All-OVC team
The Colonels had three players selected to the preseason all-OVC team.

Offense

Dan Paul – TE

Aaron Patrick – DL

Specialists

LJ Scott – KR

Schedule

Game summaries

Morehead State

at Marshall

at Bowling Green

Southeast Missouri State

Jacksonville State

at UT Martin

Murray State

Eastern Illinois

at Austin Peay

Robert Morris

at Tennessee Tech

References

Eastern Kentucky
Eastern Kentucky Colonels football seasons
Eastern Kentucky Colonels football